Cayzer is a surname. Notable people with the surname include:

Charles Cayzer (disambiguation), several people
August Cayzer (1876–1943), English shipowner
Cayzer baronets
Geoff Cayzer (born 1945), Australian rules footballer
Lindy W. Cayzer (born 1952), Australian botanist